Agapanthia turanica is a species of beetle in the family Cerambycidae. It was described by Plavilstshikov in 1929.

References

turanica
Beetles described in 1929